Al Noor Mosque may refer to:

Algeria

Dominican Republic
 Al-Noor Mosque (Santo Domingo), Santo Domingo

East Timor
 An-Nur Mosque (Dili), Dili

Egypt
 Al-Nour Mosque (Cairo), Cairo

Indonesia
 , Ambon, Maluku
 An-Nur Great Mosque Pekanbaru, Pekanbaru, Riau

Iraq

Japan
 , Niigata, Niigata Prefecture

Malaysia
 An-Nur Jamek Mosque, Labuan
 An-Nur Kota Raya Mosque, Johor Bahru, Johor

Maldives

New Zealand
 Al Noor Mosque, Christchurch

United Arab Emirates
 Al Noor Mosque (Sharjah)

United States
 Al Noor Mosque (City Heights)
 Nur Mosque, in the St. Louis Islamic Center, St. Louis, Missouri
 An-Noor Mosque (Guam)

Yemen
 , Lahj
 , Yafa